Austrocordulia is a genus of dragonfly in the family Austrocorduliidae,
endemic to northern and eastern Australia.
Species of Austrocordulia are medium-sized, dark-coloured dragonflies, either brown or black with yellow markings.

Species
The genus includes the following species:

 Austrocordulia leonardi  – Sydney hawk
 Austrocordulia refracta  – eastern hawk
 Austrocordulia territoria  – Top End hawk

Note about family
There are differing views as to the family that Austrocordulia best belongs to:
 It is considered to be part of the Austrocorduliidae family at the Australian Faunal Directory
 It is considered to be part of the Synthemistidae family in the World Odonata List at the Slater Museum of Natural History
 It is considered to be part of the Corduliidae family at Wikispecies

See also
 List of Odonata species of Australia

References

Austrocorduliidae
Anisoptera genera
Odonata of Australia
Endemic fauna of Australia
Taxa named by Robert John Tillyard
Insects described in 1909
Taxonomy articles created by Polbot